A Warning to the Curious and Other Ghost Stories is the title of M. R. James' fourth and final collection of ghost stories, published in 1925.

Montague Rhodes James (1862–1936) was a medievalist scholar; Provost of King's College, Cambridge. He wrote many of his ghost stories to be read aloud in the long tradition of spooky Christmas Eve tales. His stories often use rural settings, with a quiet, scholarly protagonist getting caught up in the activities of supernatural forces. The details of horror are almost never explicit, the stories relying on a gentle, bucolic background to emphasise the awfulness of the otherworldly intrusions.

Contents of the original edition
 "The Haunted Dolls' House"
 "The Uncommon Prayer-Book"
 "A Neighbour's Landmark"
 "A View from a Hill"
 "A Warning to the Curious"
 "An Evening's Entertainment"

References

Sources

External links

 



1925 short story collections
Short story collections by M. R. James
Ghosts in written fiction
Ghost stories